The Staatstheater Darmstadt (Darmstadt State Theatre) is a theatre company and building in Darmstadt, Hesse, Germany, presenting opera, ballet, plays and concerts. It is funded by the state of Hesse and the city of Darmstadt. Its history began in 1711 with a court theatre building. From 1919 it was run as Landestheater Darmstadt. The present theatre was opened in 1972 when the company was named Staatstheater.

History 

The theatre dates back more than 300 years. It was originally a court theatre at the residence of the county Darmstadt. At a request by  a first theatre building in Darmstadt was opened in 1711 with Christoph Graupner's opera Telemach.

Großherzogliches Hoftheater Karolinenplatz
About a century later, Louis I, Grand Duke of Hesse, built a court theatre open to the citizens. The architect Georg Moller built a theatre with 2000 seats and advanced stage machinery, opened in 1819. It burnt down in 1871 and was restored in seven years.

Landestheater Karolinenplatz
In 1919 the theatre became a Landestheater. The former building was made the small stage (Kleines Haus). Director  (1920–1924 and 1931–1933) made the theatre famous for premieres of contemporary authors. He was forced to flee by the Nazis. Actress Lilli Palmer, then 20 years old, emigrated to Paris. Both halls of the theatre were destroyed by bombs in the night 11 to 12 September 1944. After the war a provisional stage was found in the Orangerie, where the company played for almost three decades. The play Männersache by Franz Xaver Kroetz premiered in 1972. In 1966 Maciej Łukaszczyk arrived and worked as a Répétiteur at the Landestheater Darmstadt. In 1970 he founded the Chopin Organisation.

Staatstheater Georg-Büchner-Platz
Reinhard Febel's opera Morels Erfindung premiered on 6 November 1994. Jan Müller-Wieland's chamber opera in one act Die Nachtigall und die Rose was first performed in 1996, Die Versicherung after a play by Peter Weiss in 1999.

Building 

The present building was opened in 1972, when the theatre was named Staatstheater. The theatre is funded by the state of Hesse and the city of Darmstadt. The building was designed by the Darmstadt architect Rolf Prange who had won a national competition in 1963. The great hall (Großes Haus) seats 956 people, the small hall (Kleines Haus), mostly for plays and dance, 482. A chamber theatre (Kammerspiele) seats 120. The Großes Haus was opened on 6 October 1972 with Beethoven's Fidelio, the Kleines Haus a day later with Gaston Salvatore's Büchners Tod.

From 2002 to 2006 the building was restored, with new technical and safety features. It was reopened with Leoš Janáček's Schicksal and Lélio oder die Rückkehr ins Leben by Hector Berlioz on 22 September 2006, and a day later Schiller's Don Karlos.

Artistic leadership 
John Dew has been director of the theatre from 2004 till 2014. Since 2014 the intendant is Karsten Wiegand.

Honorary members 
Source:
 Karl Böhm, general music director (1927–1931)
 , opera director (16 August 1951 – 31 October 1976)
 Hans Drewanz, general music director (16 August 1963 – 31 December 1994)
 , Intendant (1961–1971)
 George Maran, tenor (16 August 1956 – 30 November 1995)
 Manfred Michel, director (16 August 1970 – 31 March 1994)
 Gustav Rudolf Sellner, Intendant (1951–1961)

References

Further reading

External links 

 
 
 Staatstheater Darmstadt theoperacritic.com
 Staatstheater Darmstadt klassik-heute.com 
 

Theatres in Germany
Opera houses in Germany
Theatres completed in 1711
Music venues completed in 1711
Theatres completed in 1819
Music venues completed in 1819
Theatres completed in 1972
Music venues completed in 1972
1711 establishments in the Holy Roman Empire